A landing zone (LZ) is an area where aircraft can land.

Landing zone may also refer to:
 SpaceX landing zone (set index), SpaceX's land-based rocket landing facilities
 Hard disc drive landing zone, a safe area to land HDD flying heads during hard disk drive failure
 Landing zone, or staging, a storage area used for data processing during the extract, transform and load (ETL) process

See also
 Drop zone (disambiguation)
 Landing (disambiguation)
 Landing area
 Landing pad (disambiguation)
 Landing strip (disambiguation)
 LZ (disambiguation)
 Rocket landing pad (disambiguation)